Édouard Therriault (born February 16, 2003) is a Canadian freestyle skier who competes internationally.

He competed in the FIS Freestyle Ski and Snowboarding World Championships 2021, where he won a silver medal in men's ski big air.

On January 24, 2022, Therriault was named to Canada's 2022 Olympic team.

References

External links

Édouard Therriault at the Canadian Olympic Committee

2003 births
Living people
Canadian male freestyle skiers
Freestyle skiers at the 2022 Winter Olympics
Olympic freestyle skiers of Canada
People from Laurentides
Sportspeople from Quebec